Ahmed Al Khattab (1942 – 9 May 2021) was a Jordanian politician.

Biography
Al Khattab was born in Ma'an in 1942. He graduated from the Palestine Technical University – Kadoorie in 1962 with a bachelor's degree in agriculture. He went on to serve as President of the university's Alumni Club.

Al Khattab became Director of Agriculture for the Ma'an Governorate and was also railway director in Aqaba. He was elected to the House of Representatives of Jordan, serving from 1997 to 2001. He was also  in Awn Shawkat Al-Khasawneh's cabinet, Fayez al-Tarawneh's second cabinet, and Abdullah Ensour's cabinet.

In 2013 and in 2018, the Palestine Technical University – Kadoorie honored him as a pioneering graduate.

Ahmed Al Khattab died on 9 May 2021.

References

1942 births
2021 deaths
Agriculture ministers of Jordan
Members of the House of Representatives (Jordan)
People from Ma'an Governorate
Date of birth missing
Palestine Technical University alumni